There were twelve elections in 1947 to the United States House of Representatives during the 80th United States Congress.

List of elections 
Elections are listed by date and district.

|-
! 
| John Sparkman
|  | Democratic
| 1936
|  | Incumbent resigned November 5, 1946 to become U.S. Senator.New member elected January 28, 1947.Democratic hold.
| nowrap | 

|-
! 
| Robert K. Henry
|  | Republican
| 1944
|  | Incumbent died November 20, 1946.New member elected April 22, 1947.Republican hold.
| nowrap | 

|-
! 
| Fred B. Norman
|  | Republican
| 1946
|  | Incumbent died April 18, 1947.New member elected June 7, 1947.Republican hold.
| nowrap | 

|-
! 
| Thomas D'Alesandro Jr.
|  | Democratic
| 1938
|  | Incumbent resigned May 16, 1947 to become mayor of Baltimore.New member elected July 15, 1947.Democratic hold.
| nowrap | 

|-
! 
| Joseph J. Mansfield
|  | Democratic
| 1916
|  | Incumbent died July 12, 1947.New member elected August 23, 1947.Democratic hold.
| nowrap | 

|-
! 
| R. Ewing Thomason
|  | Democratic
| 1930
|  | Incumbent resigned July 31, 1947 to become U.S. District Judge.New member elected August 23, 1947.Democratic hold.
| nowrap | 

|-
! 
| Fred Bradley
|  | Republican
| 1938
|  | Incumbent died May 24, 1947.New member elected August 26, 1947.Republican hold.
| nowrap | 

|-
! 
| Charles L. Gerlach
|  | Republican
| 1938
|  | Incumbent died May 5, 1947.New member elected September 9, 1947.Republican hold.
| nowrap | 

|-
! 
| Raymond S. Springer
|  | Republican
| 1938
|  | Incumbent died August 28, 1947.New member elected November 4, 1947.Republican hold.
| nowrap | 

|-
! 
| Leo F. Rayfiel
|  | Democratic
| 1944
|  | Incumbent resigned September 13, 1947.New member elected November 4, 1947.Democratic hold.
| nowrap | 

|-
! 
| Robert F. Jones
|  | Republican
| 1938
|  | Incumbent resigned September 2, 1947 to join the Federal Communications Commission.New member elected November 4, 1947.Republican hold.
| nowrap | 

|-
! 
| Charles L. Gifford
|  | Republican
| 1942
|  | Incumbent died August 23, 1947.New member elected November 18, 1947.Republican hold.
| nowrap | 

|}

References 

 
1947